Zirdan (also Romanized as Zīrdān) is a village in Abtar Rural District, in the Central District of Iranshahr County, Sistan and Baluchestan Province, Iran. At the 2006 census, its population was 16, in 4 families.

References 

Populated places in Iranshahr County